Natale Ricci (1677–1754) was an Italian painter, He was a pupil of Carlo Maratti, and a native of Fermo. He practised in Italy in the 18th century. He is part of the family of painters that includes Ubaldo (1669–1731), Filippo (1715–1793), and Alessandro Ricci (1750–1829).

References

1677 births
1754 deaths
People from Fermo
Pupils of Carlo Maratta
18th-century Italian painters
Italian male painters
18th-century Italian male artists